The vice commandant of the Coast Guard serves as the second-in-command of the United States Coast Guard, behind only the commandant of the Coast Guard.

Since 1929, 31 officers have served as Vice Commandant, or, as the position was referred to before 1972, Assistant Commandant. This position has been historically held by a vice admiral until the Coast Guard Authorization Act of 2015 elevated the statutory rank for the position to admiral.

The current vice commandant is Admiral Steven D. Poulin, who assumed office on May 31, 2022.

Vice commandants of the Coast Guard

See also

Commandant of the Coast Guard
Master Chief Petty Officer of the Coast Guard
Vice Chief of Staff of the Army
Assistant Commandant of the Marine Corps
Vice Chief of Naval Operations
Vice Chief of Staff of the Air Force
Vice Chief of Space Operations

References

Vice Commandants of the Coast Guard

External links
Vice Commandant's official website

United States Coast Guard job titles